|}

The Irish 1,000 Guineas is a Group 1 flat horse race in Ireland open to three-year-old thoroughbred fillies. It is run at the Curragh over a distance of 1 mile (1,609 metres), and it is scheduled to take place each year in May.

History
The event was established in 1922, a year after the launch of the Irish 2,000 Guineas. The inaugural running was won by Lady Violette.

It is Ireland's equivalent of the 1000 Guineas, and in recent years it has taken place three weeks after that race. The field usually includes horses which previously contested the English version, and four have achieved victory in both events; Attraction in 2004, Finsceal Beo in 2007, Winter in 2017 and Hermosa in 2019.

The leading horses from the Irish 1,000 Guineas often go on to compete in the following month's Coronation Stakes. The last to win both races was Alpha Centauri in 2018.

Records
Leading jockey (7 wins):
 Morny Wing – Lady Violette (1922), Glenshesk (1923), Spiral (1931), Sol Speranza (1937), Gainsworth (1940), Panastrid (1945), Sea Symphony (1947)

Leading trainer (10 wins):
 Aidan O'Brien - Classic Park (1997), Imagine (2001), Yesterday (2003), Halfway To Heaven (2008), Misty For Me (2011), Marvellous (2014), Winter (2017), Hermosa (2019), Peaceful (2020), Empress Josephine (2021)

Leading owner since 1950 (10 wins): (includes part ownership)
 Sue Magnier – Imagine (2001), Yesterday (2003), Halfway to Heaven (2008), Again (2009), Misty for Me (2011), Marvellous (2014), Winter (2017), Hermosa (2019), Peaceful (2020), Empress Josephine (2021)

Winners since 1960

Earlier winners

 1922: Lady Violette
 1923: Glenshesk
 1924: Voltoi
 1925: Flying Dinah
 1926: Resplendent
 1927: West Indies
 1928: Moucheron
 1929: Soloptic
 1930: Star of Egypt
 1931: Spiral
 1932: Petoni
 1933: Spy-Ann
 1934: Kyloe
 1935: Smokeless
 1936: Harvest Star
 1937: Sol Speranza
 1938: Lapel
 1939: Serpent Star
 1940: Gainsworth
 1941: Milady Rose
 1942: Majideh
 1943: Suntop
 1944: Annetta
 1945: Panastrid
 1946: Ella Retford
 1947: Sea Symphony
 1948: Morning Wings
 1949: Sunlit Ride
 1950: Princess Trudy
 1951: Queen of Sheba
 1952: Nashua
 1953: Northern Gleam
 1954: Pantomime Queen
 1955: Dark Issue
 1956: Pederoba
 1957: Even Star
 1958: Butiaba
 1959: Fiorentina

See also
 Horse racing in Ireland
 List of Irish flat horse races

References
 Paris-Turf:
 Racing Post:

 galopp-sieger.de – Irish 1000 Guineas.
 ifhaonline.org – International Federation of Horseracing Authorities – Irish 1000 Guineas (2019).
 irishracinggreats.com – Irish 1,000 Guineas (Group 1).
 pedigreequery.com – Irish 1000 Guineas Stakes – Curragh.
 tbheritage.com – Irish One Thousand Guineas.

Flat races in Ireland
Curragh Racecourse
Flat horse races for three-year-old fillies
Recurring sporting events established in 1922